Xeroplexa setubalensis is a species of air-breathing land snail, a terrestrial pulmonate gastropod mollusk in the family Geomitridae. 

The taxa was previously placed within the genus Candidula until a molecular phylogenetic study revealed its current status. This taxon is the type species of the genus Xeroplexa.

Description

Distribution 

X. setubalensis is endemic to the central coast of Portugal (western Iberian Peninsula). Only few populations are known from Serra da Arrábida and Serra do São Luís, placed in the right side of Sado river.

The subspecies Xeroplexa setubalensis amanda (Bourguignat, 1864) occurs off Oran, Algeria.

References

External links 
 http://luisjavierchueca.com/research-3/candidula-s-l/
 Morelet, A. (1845). Description des mollusques terrestres et fluviatiles du Portugal. Baillière, Paris. i-vii + 1-115 (+ 1), 14 pls
 feiffer, L. (1850). Beschreibungen neuer Landschnecken. Zeitschrift für Malakozoologie. Cassel. 7 (5): 65-80 (July 1850); 7 (6): 81-89 (August 1850)
 Gittenberger, E. (1985). The taxonomic status of Xeroplexa Monterosato, 1892 (Pulmonata: Helicidae: Helicellinae), a surprise. Iberus. 5: 59-62

setubalensis
Gastropods described in 1850